Brenda Josephine Cannell MHK (born 2 July 1952) is the current member of the House of Keys for Douglas East. She was first elected in the 1996 general election.

Career 
Cannell was a councillor for the Derby Ward of Douglas Town Council from 1992 to '95, serving as Chairman of the Public Health and Housing Committee (1993–94) and sitting on various other committees and groups. She also worked for the Isle of Man branch of Friends of the Earth.

In 1996 she was elected as an MHK, and since that time has been Chairman of the Isle of Man Water Authority from 2002 to '04, and then Chairman of the Planning Committee (2004-2005), amongst many other roles. She was re-elected in 2001, 2006, and 2011.

Personal life 
She was born Brenda Josephine Jones on 2 July 1952 in Liverpool and moved to the island in 1977.  She was a hair stylist prior to becoming an MHK, and her interests include music, gardening and the environment. She is married to Charles Randall Cannell, they have two sons named Louis and Samuel. Brenda also has two brothers named Marcus and Stephen who have between them 6 children; Lyndsey, Marcus Jnr., Beth, Nicole, Jake and Robyn.

References

Manx women in politics
1952 births
Living people
21st-century British women politicians
20th-century British women politicians
Members of the House of Keys 1996–2001
Members of the House of Keys 2001–2006
Members of the House of Keys 2006–2011
Members of the House of Keys 2011–2016